The 2013 British Supersport season is the 26th British Supersport Championship season.

Race calendar and results
The 2013 MCE Insurance British Superbike Championship calendar has been announced on 10 October 2012 by MSVR.

Championship standings

Entry list

References

External links
 The official website of the British Supersport Championship

British
Supersport
British Supersport Championship